Lin Jun may refer to:
Lin Jun (engineer) (born 1954), Chinese engineer 
Lin Jun (politician) (born 1949), Chinese politician
Murder of Lin Jun, 2012 murder of a Chinese student in Canada